Swapnil Joshi (Marathi pronunciation: [sʋəpniːl d͡ʒoʃiː]) is an Indian film and television actor, in Hindi and Marathi languages. At nine years old, he appeared in the Ramanand Sagar show Uttar Ramayan. He has done some of the most successful series in television such as Krishna, Eka Lagnachi Dusri Goshta as well as films like Duniyadari, Mumbai-Pune-Mumbai casting him as the lead actor. He has done many comedy shows like Comedy Circus and Papad Pol – Shahabuddin Rathod Ki Rangeen Duniya in Hindi industry. Swapnil owns a wrestling team named 'Vidarbhache Wagh' in Zee Maharashtra Kusti Dangal. He was ranked twelfth in The Times of India's Top 20 Most Desirable Men of Maharashtra in 2017.

Personal life
Swapnil married the dentist Aparna in 2005, but they were divorced in 2009. After two years, he married dentist Leena Aradhye. They have two children together, a daughter named Myra and a son named Raghav.

Career

Debut and breakthrough (1989-2010)

At the age of nine, Joshi started his acting career with Ramanand Sagar's show Uttar Ramayana, where he played the role of young Kusha. In 1993, he was offered the role of young Krishna in another Ramanand Sagar's show named Krishna. Later, Joshi took a break from acting and made a comeback as a youth actor with Sanjeev Bhattacharya's show Campus. He then continued working in Hindi shows like Hudd Kar Di, Dil Vil Pyar Vyar, Des Mein Niklla Hoga Chand, Hare Kkaanch Ki Choodiyaan to name a few. In 1997, he played the role of Inder in Zee TV's popular show Amanat. Then, he played the role of Dhruv, a parallel lead in the serial Kehta Hai Dil. In 1997, he first played the supporting role of Vikram Dixit in the film Ghulam-E-Mustafa, starring Nana Patekar and Raveena Tandon.

He also portrayed the role of Dr. Prakash in the popular show Bhabhi. He played the role of Arjun, Supriya Pilgaonkar's youngest son in the show Kadvee Khatee Meethi, which was a sequel of super-hit comedy show Tu Tu Main Main. He also hosted the kid's talent show named Chota Packet Bada Dhamaka. In 2008, he participated on Sony TV's show Mr. & Ms. TV, which was judged by Madhur Bhandarkar and Sonali Bendre. He won the show along with actress Purvi Joshi. His first Marathi film was Manini, where he played the lead role of Deepak Rajyadhakshya. In 2008, he acted in the multi-starrer film Checkmate.

He played the role of Chingya in the comedy film Amhi Satpute. He then played the lead character of Yash in the Marathi series Adhuri Ek Kahani opposite Kishori Godbole. He also acted in the comedy show Tere Gharchya Samor. He played the role of Pratap in the show Ardhangini.

Established actor (2010-present)

In 2010, he played the lead role of a boy from Pune in the hit, romantic film Mumbai-Pune-Mumbai opposite Mukta Barve. His chemistry with Barve in the film was compared to that of Shah Rukh Khan and Kajol. He also played the lead role of Yash Kumar in the Hindi film The Life Zindagi in 2011.

Joshi then turned his attention towards comedy shows and participated in the first season of Comedy Circus. He was paired with V.I.P and the duo was declared as runner's up of the show. Later, he was the contestant of various seasons of Comedy Circus like Comedy Circus-Chinchpokli To China, Comedy Circus- 20-20, Comedy Circus Ke Superstars, Comedy Circus Ke Tansen and more. In the eighth season of the show named Comedy Circus- Maha Sangram, he became victorious along with his partner VIP. Joshi also hosted the comedy show Ladies Special on Zee TV. He also played a small role in Sab TV's comedy show Sajan Re Jhoot Mat Bolo. He played the role of Sameer on DD National's show Bajega Band Baaja, which was followed by Sab TV's Papad Pol – Shahabuddin Rathod Ki Rangeen Duniya, where he played the role of Vinaychand. In both the series, he was paired with Ami Trivedi.

In 2012, he played the lead role of Sachin on Sab TV's comedy show Golmaal Hai Bhai Sab Golmaal Hai. In the same year anchored the dance reality show Eka Peksha Ek that aired on Zee Marathi. In 2011, he played an episodic role of Siddhanth, a city boy who is married to a village bell, Gauri (played by Mukta Barve) in the show Madhu Ethe Ani Chandra Tithe. Later, he judged the comedy reality show Fu Bai Fu and played the role of Ghanashyam Kale in the show Eka Lagnachi Dusri Goshta opposite Mukta Barve on Zee Marathi. He has also had his own Radio show named The Swapnil Joshi Show on Red FM 93.5. In 2013, he portrayed the role of Shreyas Talvalkar opposite Sai Tamhankar in Duniyadari. In the same year, he was once again paired opposite Mukta Barve in the film Mangalashtak Once More where he played Satyajit Pathak.

In 2014, Joshi was seen opposite Sai Tamhankar once again in Sanjay Jadhav's film Pyaar Vali Love Story, which upon the release took good opening and was a hit at the box office. In 2014, Joshi also hosted a talk show Dhabal-Ek Timepass on Star Pravah. In 2015, his first appearance was in the film Mitwaa as Shivam Sarang alongside Sonalee Kulkarni and Prarthana Behere.Mitwaa opened to great response at the box office and was declared “super hit”. His next release was opposite Amruta Khanvilkar, Welcome Zindagi where he played Anand Prabhu. He next featured in Sanjay Jadhav's Tu Hi Re opposite Sai Tamhankar and Tejaswini Pandit. His final release of the year was Satish Rajwade's Mumbai-Pune-Mumbai 2, sequel of Mumbai-Pune-Mumbai opposite Mukta Barve where he played Gautam Pradhan. In 2016, his initial appearance was in R.Madhesh's film, Friends opposite Gauri Nalawde and alongside Sachit Patil.

He later starred in a film Laal Ishq produced by Sanjay Leela Bhansali and directed by Swapna Waghmare Joshi. It also stars Anjana Sukhani for first time in Marathi films. It released on 27 May. He is also starring in a film Fugay along with Subodh Bhave and directed by Swapna Waghmare Joshi. He has done a family film Fugay with his brother Subodh Bhave. A change in it is that they have exchanged their surnames Subodh Joshi and Swapnil Bhave. He is also starred in the Marathi film Bhikari directed by Ganesh Acharya.

Filmography

Films

Television

Web series

Theatre
 Get Well Soon

Radio
 Share it with Swwapnil

Awards and nominations

References

External links

 

20th-century Indian male actors
1977 births
Living people
Male actors from Mumbai
University of Mumbai alumni
Indian male television actors
Indian stand-up comedians
Participants in Indian reality television series
Male actors in Marathi cinema
Indian male soap opera actors
21st-century Indian male actors
Male actors in Marathi television